Bowles Creek is a glacial meltwater distributary stream,  long, which flows east from Maria Creek into the southwest end of Lake Fryxell, close west of Green Creek, in Taylor Valley, Victoria Land. The name was suggested by hydrologist Diane McKnight, the leader of a United States Geological Survey (USGS) team which made extensive studies of the hydrology and geochemistry of streams and ponds in the Lake Fryxell basin, 1987–94. The creek is named after USGS hydrologist Elizabeth C. Bowles, a member of the field team in the 1987–88 summer season, who conducted a study of organic geochemistry of streams flowing into Lake Fryxell.

References 

Rivers of Victoria Land
McMurdo Dry Valleys